Thapar Polytechnic College is a polytechnic college in Punjab, India. It is situated near Nabha Road, Patiala on the Thapar Institute of Engineering and Technology campus. It offers diplomas in five streams. It is affiliated to PSBTE & IT (the Punjab State Board of Technical Education and Industrial Training). There is no entrance exam and admissions are given on the basis of merit of 10th standard . Minimum percentage criteria is 60%. This college is 95 % government aided by Department of Technical Education Government of Punjab.

Streams for engineering 
 Architectural Assistantship
 Civil Engineering
 Computer Engineering
 Electrical Engineering
 Mechanical Engineering

History 

Thapar Polytechnic College, Patiala (formerly Thapar Polytechnic, Patiala) came into existence in 1956 due to the missionary zeal of the visionary late Lala Karam Chand Thapar. It is a privately-managed government aided institution affiliated to Punjab State Board of Technical Education and Industrial Training, Chandigarh. In 1956, it offered 3-year Diploma courses in Civil Eng., Electrical Eng. and Mechanical Eng. with a total intake of 60 students. It offers Diploma courses i.e. Diploma in Civil Engg., Electrical Engg. Mechanical Engg, Computer Engg and Architectural Assistantship with a total annual intake of 350 students. It is one of the three organizations on Thapar Technology Campus, the other two are Thapar University (formerly Thapar Institute of Engineering & Technology) and Thapar Centre for Industrial Research & Development. It has been registered as a Society under Registration of Societies Act 1860.

Universities and colleges in Punjab, India
Education in Patiala
Educational institutions established in 1956
1956 establishments in East Punjab